Leeson's equation is an empirical expression that describes an oscillator's phase noise spectrum.

Leeson's expression for single-sideband (SSB) phase noise in dBc/Hz (decibels relative to output level per hertz) and augmented for flicker noise:

There is often misunderstanding around Leeson's equation, even in text books. In the 1966 paper, Leeson stated correctly that " is the signal level at the oscillator active element input" (often referred to as the power through the resonator now, strictly speaking it is the available power at the amplifier input).  F is the device noise factor, however this does need to be measured at the operating power level. The common misunderstanding, that  is the oscillator output level, may result from derivations that are not completely general.  In 1982, W. P. Robins (IEEE Publication "Phase noise in signal sources") correctly showed that the Leeson equation (in the -20 dB/decade region) is not just an empirical rule, but a result that follows from a linear analysis of an oscillator circuit. However, a used constraint in his circuit was that the oscillator output power was approximately equal to the active device input power.

The Leeson equation is presented in various forms. In the above equation, if  is set to zero the equation represents a linear analysis of a feedback oscillator in the general case (and flicker noise is not included), it is for this that Leeson is most recognised, showing a -20 dB/ decade of offset frequency slope. If used correctly, the Leeson equation gives a useful prediction of oscillator performance in this range. So for accurate results,  must be determined from added noise measurements on the amplifier using R.F., with the actual circuit configuration to be used in the oscillator.

Evidence that  is the amplifier input power (often contradicted or very unclear in text books) can be found in the derivation in further reading which also shows experimental results, Enrico Rubiola, The Leeson Effect also shows this in a different form.

References

Further reading
 
 
Brooking, P, Derivation of Leeson's equation   https://www.youtube.com/channel/UCzJBRg4C5dbjP_4PWWRX4Dg

External links
Ali M. Niknejad, Oscillator Phase Noise, University of California, Berkeley, 2009 http://rfic.eecs.berkeley.edu/~niknejad/ee242/pdf/eecs242_lect22_phasenoise.pdf, stating "Leeson modified the above noise model to account for several experimentally observed phenomena". Also, "In Leeson’s model, the factor F is a fitting parameter rather than arising from any physical concepts. It’s tempting to call this the oscillator "noise figure", but this is misleading."
John van der Merwe, An Experimental Investigation into the Validity of Leeson's Equation for Low Phase Noise Oscillator Design, December 2010, https://scholar.sun.ac.za/bitstream/handle/10019.1/5424/vandermerwe_experimental_2010.pdf and http://www.researchgate.net/publication/48339964_An_experimental_investigation_into_the_validity_of_Leeson's_equation_for_low_phase_noise_oscillator_design
Enrico Rubiola, The Leeson effect, .

Electronic oscillators